Margaret Wintringham  (née Longbottom; 4 August 1879 – 10 March 1955) was a British Liberal Party politician. She was the second woman, and the first British-born woman, to take her seat in the House of Commons of the United Kingdom.

Early life 

Margaret Longbottom was born in the hamlet of Oldfield in the West Riding approximately four miles west of Keighley, West Riding of Yorkshire, and educated at Bolton Road School, Silsden where her father was the head teacher, and then Keighley Girls' Grammar School. After training at Bedford Training College, she worked as a teacher, eventually becoming headmistress of a school in Grimsby. In 1903 she married Thomas Wintringham, a timber merchant.

They had no children, and Margaret Wintringham became a magistrate and a member of the Grimsby Education Committee. She was involved in many political movements, including the National Union of Women Workers, the British Temperance Association, the National Union of Societies for Equal Citizenship (NUSEC), the Women's Institute, the Electrical Association for Women, the Townswomen's Guild and the Liberal Party.

Political career 

When her husband was elected as Member of Parliament (MP) for Louth in Lincolnshire, she moved with him from Grimsby to Louth and remained politically active. When Thomas Wintringham died in 1921, she was selected as the Liberal candidate to replace him, and on 22 September she won the 1921 Louth by-election, becoming the first ever female Liberal MP and the third woman elected to the House of Commons. The first woman to be elected had been the abstentionist Constance Markievicz in 1918; the first to take her seat was the Conservative Nancy Astor, elected in 1919. Wintringham was elected again in the 1922 and 1923 general elections.

In Parliament, she campaigned for an equal franchise; the Representation of the People Act 1918 had extended the vote to all men over the age of 21, but only to some women over the age of 30. 
She also campaigned for equal pay for women, for state scholarships for girls as well as boys, and women-only railway carriages.

At the 1924 general election, she lost her seat in Parliament to the Conservative Arthur Heneage. Although she stood again in Louth at the 1929 general election and in Aylesbury at the 1935 election she did not return to the House of Commons.

She was the president of the Louth Women's Liberal Association and from 1925 to 1926 she was president of the Women's National Liberal Federation. In 1927 she was one of two women elected to the national executive of the National Liberal Federation. She was a Vice President of the Electrical Association for Women.

See also 
 1921 Louth by-election

References

Sources

External links 
 

1879 births
1955 deaths
People from Keighley
Liberal Party (UK) MPs for English constituencies
English justices of the peace
UK MPs 1918–1922
UK MPs 1922–1923
UK MPs 1923–1924
Female members of the Parliament of the United Kingdom for English constituencies
National Council of Women of Great Britain members
20th-century English women politicians
20th-century English politicians
Spouses of British politicians